Bonnie Poe (October 15, 1912 – October 16, 1993) was an American actress and voice artist, best known for providing the voice for the Fleischer Studios animated character Betty Boop beginning in 1933, starting with the Popeye the Sailor series and featuring in a dozen cartoons. She voiced her in a live-action segment on the special Hollywood on Parade No. A-8, performing a skit with Bela Lugosi providing a portrayal of Count Dracula.

Career 
In 1933, Poe was a voice actress for Betty Boop, including voicing her on a few  episodes of an NBC radio special called Betty Boop Fables 
Poe was the initial voice for the character Olive Oyl in that studio's series of Popeye. Poe also portrayed Betty Boop in an on-camera live action short.

Poe died from complications connected to pneumonia on October 16, 1993, the day after her 81st birthday.

Filmography

1933
 Betty Boop's Ker-Choo – Betty Boop (voice, uncredited)
 Boilesk – various (uncredited)
 Hollywood on Parade No. A-8 – Betty Boop (on-camera)
 Mother Goose Land – Betty Boop (voice, uncredited)
 Morning, Noon and Night – Betty Boop (voice, uncredited)
 Betty Boop's Hallowe'en Party – Betty Boop (voice, uncredited)
 Popeye the Sailor – Betty Boop & Olive Oyl (voice, uncredited)
 The Old Man of the Mountain – Betty Boop (voice, uncredited)
 I Yam What I Yam – Olive Oyl (voice, uncredited)
 Blow Me Down! – Olive Oyl (voice, uncredited)
 Seasin's Greetinks! – Olive Oyl (voice, uncredited)
 Wild Elephinks – Olive Oyl (voice, uncredited)
 Parade of the Wooden Soldiers – Betty Boop (voice, uncredited)

1934
 She Wronged Him Right – Betty Boop (voice, uncredited)
 Red Hot Mamma – various (voice, uncredited)
 Let's You and Him Fight – Olive Oyl (voice, uncredited)
 Betty in Blunderland – Betty Boop (voice, uncredited)
 Betty Boop's Rise to Fame – Betty Boop (voice, uncredited)
 Strong to the Finich – Olive Oyl (voice, uncredited)
 Betty Boop's Life Guard - Betty Boop (voice, uncredited)
 Poor Cinderella - Betty Boop, Fairy Godmother, Ugly Stepsisters (voice, uncredited)
 Rambling 'Round Radio Row – herself (on-camera)

1935
 Dizzy Divers – Olive Oyl (voice, uncredited)

1938
 Out of the Inkwell – Betty Boop (voice, uncredited)
 The Swing School - Betty Boop, Pudgy (voice, uncredited)

References

External links
 
 Bonnie Poe at the Three Stooges Online Filmography
 
 Bonnie Poe at Otrrpedia

1912 births
1993 deaths
American voice actresses
American film actresses
20th-century American actresses
Actresses from Chicago
Fleischer Studios people
Deaths from pneumonia in Illinois